Cathey is a surname of Scottish origin. It is a reduced form of the surname MacCathay which is Galloway surname of uncertain origin.

Morgan Cathey (born 1984), American soccer player.
Reg E. Cathey, (born 1958), American film and television actor.

References

See also
Cathey Peak, a peak in the Sacramento Mountains, in the south-central part of the US State of New Mexico.